The Sri Lanka cricket team toured Bangladesh in May 2022 to play two Test matches. The Test series formed part of the 2021–2023 ICC World Test Championship. The fixtures for the tour were confirmed in March 2022. In June 2020, the International Cricket Council (ICC) relaxed its rules on using neutral match officials, due to the impact of the COVID-19 pandemic. In April 2022, the ICC confirmed that neutral umpires would return to Test match cricket, with Richard Kettleborough from England and Joel Wilson of the West Indies standing in the first and second Tests respectively.

The first Test ended in a draw late on the fifth day, with Sri Lanka's Dinesh Chandimal and Niroshan Dickwella putting on an unbeaten partnership of 99 for the seventh wicket. Teammate Angelo Mathews was named the player of the match, after he scored 199 in the first innings. One the first day of the second Test, Bangladesh were reduced to 24/5 within the first hour of the match. Mushfiqur Rahim and Litton Das then made a partnership of 272 runs, the highest partnership for the sixth wicket or lower in a Test match after a team had lost its first five wickets for less than 25 runs. Bangladesh were bowled out for 365 runs in their first innings, with Mushfiqur Rahim finishing on 175 not out. In reply, Sri Lanka made 506, with Angelo Mathews again top-scoring for the side, with an unbeaten 145 runs. Bangladesh could only manage to score 169 in their second innings, with Sri Lanka winning by ten wickets to win the two-match series 1–0.

Following the conclusion of the tour, Mominul Haque resigned as the captain of Bangladesh's Test team.

Squads

Prior to the series, Mehidy Hasan was ruled out Bangladesh's squad for the first Test due to a finger injury, with Nayeem Hasan named as his replacement. On 29 April 2022, Mosaddek Hossain was also added to Bangladesh's squad for the first Test. Shakib Al Hasan was initially ruled out of Bangladesh's squad for the first Test after he tested positive for COVID-19. However, he later provided a negative test, allowing him to play in the match. Bangladesh's Shoriful Islam and Nayeem Hasan were both ruled out of the second Test, after they suffered a fractured hand and a fractured finger respectively.

Warm-up match

Test series

1st Test

2nd Test

Notes

References

External links
 Series home at ESPN Cricinfo

2022 in Bangladeshi cricket
2022 in Sri Lankan cricket
International cricket competitions in 2022
Sri Lankan cricket tours of Bangladesh